Basilica Mountain is a summit in Alberta, Canada located between Clairvaux Creek and Meadow Creek.

Basilica Mountain was so named on account of its basilica-shaped outline.

See also 
 List of mountains in the Canadian Rockies

References

Two-thousanders of Alberta
Alberta's Rockies